The Danish-UK Chamber of Commerce (DUCC) was set up to enhance the Anglo-Danish marketplace through networking. The Royal Danish Embassy in London was one of the co-founders. To this day, the aim of the DUCC remains to promote trade and investment between Denmark and the UK by providing companies from both countries with a business forum in the UK.

Network
The Chamber first and foremost nurtures its immediate network of Members. The Members are students/trainees and individual professionals and corporate businesses ranging from small and medium-sized enterprises to large cooperations with a global business presence covering all industries. As of April 2013 the Corporate Member count is roughly 150, including Danes and Britons as well as other nationalities with an interest in British-Danish business. Among the Members are prestigious and well-known brands such as LEGO, Carlsberg and Danfoss.

With regular contact to key stakeholders in the private sphere and in the public sector, the Chamber enjoys an excellent relationship with an extended network of decision makers.

Events
The primary platform for the Chamber's activities is the 30-40 events hosted throughout the year. The events are wideranging from casual drinks receptions to business seminars to Dinners. Topics are carefully selected to be of interest to the British-Danish business community with prominent speakers from the worlds of business and politics are invited. The events provide Members and the extended network with opportunities of networking in both formal and informal settings.

Chairmanship
 2012–present Louis de Courcy Wheeler
 2000 - 2012     Per Troen

Council members

 Louis Wheeler (Chairman)
 Ulrick Walther (Treasurer)
 Benedikte Malling Bech
 Brent Cheshire
 Conny Kalcher
 Dennis Englund
 Hans Christian Iversen
 Helle Sejersen Myrthue
 Henrik Skourup Hansen

References

External links 
 Official Website

Chambers of commerce in the United Kingdom
Denmark–United Kingdom relations